The 2014–15 Indiana Hoosiers women's basketball team represented Indiana University Bloomington during the 2014–15 NCAA Division I women's basketball season. The Hoosiers, led by first year head coach Teri Moren, play their home games at Assembly Hall and are members of the Big Ten Conference. They finished the season 15–16, 4–14 in Big Ten play to finish in twelfth place. They advanced to the second round of the Big Ten women's tournament where they lost to Rutgers.

Roster

Schedule

|-
!colspan=9 style="background:#7D110C; color:white;"| Exhibition

|-
!colspan=9 style="background:#7D110C; color:white;"| Non-conference regular Season

|-
!colspan=9 style="background:#7D110C; color:white;"| Big Ten regular Season

|-
!colspan=9 style="background:#7D110C; color:white;"| Big Ten Women's Tournament

See also
2014–15 Indiana Hoosiers men's basketball team

References

Indiana Hoosiers women's basketball seasons
Indiana
Indiana Hoosiers
Indiana Hoosiers